Vachnesh Tripathi is an Indian writer, journalist and a former editor of Panchjanya, a weekly news magazine published by the Rashtriya Swayamsevak Sangh. A former president of the Chandra Shekhar Azad Janmashatabdi Samaroh Samiti, Tripathi has authored several books. He was honored by the Government of India, in 2001, with the fourth highest Indian civilian award of Padma Shri.

See also
 Rashtriya Swayamsevak Sangh

References

Further reading

External links
 

Recipients of the Padma Shri in literature & education
Indian editors
20th-century Indian journalists